Sanjeevani or Sanjivani may refer to:

Sanjeevani (plant), in Hindu mythology, a cure-all plant which can reverse even death
Sanjeevani (singer), Zee TV voice talent hunt reality show SaReGaMa 1995 winner and playback singer
Sanjivani (2002 TV series), a 2002–2005 Indian Hindi-language television series
Sanjivani (2019 TV series), a 2019 Indian Hindi-language television series
Sanjivani College of Engineering, college in Kopargaon, Ahmednagar, Maharashtra, India 
Sanjivani Group of Institutes, Kopargaon, group including Sanjivani College of Engineering